Blair Hicken (born 10 February 1965) is a Canadian swimmer. He competed in two events at the 1984 Summer Olympics.

References

External links
 

1965 births
Living people
Canadian male swimmers
Olympic swimmers of Canada
Swimmers at the 1984 Summer Olympics
Swimmers from Mississauga
Commonwealth Games medallists in swimming
Commonwealth Games silver medallists for Canada
Commonwealth Games bronze medallists for Canada
Swimmers at the 1982 Commonwealth Games
Swimmers at the 1986 Commonwealth Games
Swimmers at the 1990 Commonwealth Games
20th-century Canadian people
21st-century Canadian people
Medallists at the 1982 Commonwealth Games
Medallists at the 1986 Commonwealth Games
Medallists at the 1990 Commonwealth Games